Zymobacter is a Gram-negative, facultatively anaerobic and non-spore-forming genus from the family of Halomonadaceae, with one known species (Zymobacter palmae). Zymobacter palmae has been isolated from palm sap from Okinawa Prefecture.

References

Oceanospirillales
Monotypic bacteria genera
Bacteria genera
Taxa described in 1995